Czarzły is the second album of Polish punk rock band Post Regiment.

Track listing 
Korzeń (en.: The root)
Znów (en.: Again)
Wielki las (en.: A great forest)
Getto (en.: Ghetto)
Dość (en.: Enough)
Szyby (en.: Windows)
Shit and show 
Brumby
Stado (en.: The herd)
After 
Skąd ty mieszkasz (en.: Where from do you live)
Kurewska (en.: Fucked up)
Norma (en.: The norm)
Rodzina (en.: Family)
Kiedy krzyczę (en.: When I shout)
Krowy (en.: Cows)
Kolory (en.: Colours)

Personnel
Max (drums)
Rolf (bass guitar)
Nika (vocals)
Smok (guitar)

Resource
http://homepages.nyu.edu/~cch223/poland/albums/postregiment_postregiment.html URL accessed at 30 August 2006

1996 albums
Post Regiment albums